Michael Roy Jornales is a Filipino actor, martial artist, fight director and singer.

Career

Acting

Jornales started out as a child actor and was one of the original child cast of Ang TV.

Jornales played P/Cpt. Francisco "Chikoy" Rivera in FPJ's Ang Probinsyano from 2015 to 2019.

In 2021, Jornales appeared as Danilo Garcia in First Yaya where he is also the stunt and routine director.

Music

Jornales formed the band SAGIPBATA in 1996 where he was vocalist and lead guitarist. He is also the lead vocalist of the band Brainwash.

Personal life
Jornales has three children with partner Jem including child actor Heath Jornales and Star Hunt: The Grand Audition Show aspirant Heather Jornales.

Filmography

Television

Film

References

External links
 

Living people
Place of birth missing (living people)
20th-century Filipino male actors
21st-century Filipino male actors
Star Magic
1984 births
Filipino male child actors
Filipino guitarists
21st-century Filipino musicians